Sidney Sheldon's If Tomorrow Comes is a 1986 American television miniseries based on the 1985 novel of the same name by Sidney Sheldon, starring Madolyn Smith, Tom Berenger and David Keith. It was directed by Jerry London and the screenplay was written by Carmen Culver.

Plot summary
Trying to get justice for her wronged mother, Tracy Whitney is instead framed by a gangster and sent to prison for 15 years. At first a victim, Tracy makes alliances and plots her escape. She abandons her plan in order to save the warden's young daughter from drowning, earning herself a pardon. Tracy avenges herself and her mother, and is soon recruited by the mysterious Gunther Hartog to be a master thief. She crosses paths with another con artist, Jeff Stevens, to whom she is attracted but is not sure she can trust. Trailing behind them is the unstable insurance investigator Daniel Cooper.

Cast
 Madolyn Smith as Tracy Whitney
 Tom Berenger as Jeff Stevens
 David Keith as Daniel Cooper
 Jack Weston as Uncle Willie
 Richard Kiley as Gunther Hartog
 Liam Neeson as Inspector André Trignant
 Barry Jenner as Zeller
 Lane Smith as Warden Brannigan
 CCH Pounder as Ernestine Littlechap
 Maryam d'Abo as Solange

Production and broadcast
The role of con artist Tracy required 16 disguises for Smith, who called the miniseries "a very classy soap opera" that is "fun and adventuresome". The seven-hour miniseries was broadcast on CBS in three parts on March 16, 17 and 18, 1986.

Home media
If Tomorrow Comes was released on VHS by Anchor Bay on September 30, 1997 (318 minutes), and in a two-disc DVD set from Image Entertainment on March 1, 2011 (313 minutes).

References

External links 
 

1986 television films
1986 films
1980s American television miniseries
Films directed by Jerry London
Television shows based on American novels
Adaptations of works by Sidney Sheldon